The hümmelchen  is a type of small German bagpipe, attested in Syntagma Musicum by Michael Praetorius during the Renaissance.

Early versions are believed to have double-reeded chanters, most likely with single-reeded drones.

The word "hümmelchen" probably comes from the  Low German word hämeln  meaning "trim".  This may refer to the hümmelchen's small size, resembling a trimmed-down version of a larger bagpipe.  Another possibly etymology comes from the word hummel ("bumble-bee"), referring to the buzzing sound of the drone.  The term hummel is still used to refer to a type of droning zither in Germanic countries.

External links 
Description of the hümmelchen

Reconstructed musical instruments
Bagpipes
German musical instruments